Daniëlle Harmsen and Julia Schruff were the defending champions, but Schruff chose not to participate. Harmsen competed with Diana Enache.

Harmsen and Enache won the title, defeating Katarzyna Piter and Barbara Sobaszkiewicz 6–2, 6–7(4–7), [11–9] in the final.

Seeds

Draw

Draw

References
 Main Draw

TEAN International - Doubles
TEAN International